Prism (Robbie) is a fictional supervillain appearing in American comic books published by Marvel Comics.  He is a member of the Marauders.

Publication history

Prism first appeared in X-Factor 10 (November 1986), and was created by Chris Claremont and Louise Simonson.

The character subsequently appears in The Uncanny X-Men #240-241 (January-February 1989), #243 (April 1989), X-Man #13 (March 1996), Generation M #3 (March 2006), X-Men and Power Pack #4 (March 2006), X-Men: The 198 Files #1 (March 2006), X-Men (vol. 2) #200-204 (August-December 2007), and X-Men: Messiah Complex #1 (December 2007).

Prism appeared as part of the "Marauders" entry in the Official Handbook of the Marvel Universe Deluxe Edition #18.

Fictional character biography
As a member of the mercenary group, the Marauders, Prism has the ability to absorb, reflect, and amplify beams of light and other energy with his crystalline body.  Prism first appeared as part of a "search and destroy" mini-team of Marauders, consisting of himself, Arclight, and Scrambler, that were sent to eliminate the members of X-Factor, who were leading an evacuation mission to help Morlocks escape the Marauders. After using his powers to reflect Cyclops's optic blast back at him, X-Factor member Jean Grey used her telekinetic powers to slam Prism against a nearby wall. Much to everyone's surprise, the move killed Prism as his body was ultimately too fragile to survive being slammed against the wall.

Prism, along with those fellow Marauders that also did not survive the Mutant Massacre, was ultimately resurrected by Mr. Sinister using his cloning technology. However, Prism's lifespan was once again cut short when he was killed by a group of demonized police officers during the opening hours of the Inferno, during a rematch between the Marauders and the X-Men (who had not battled Prism before).

Prism is a member of the 198 Mutants left after M-Day, where he was institutionalized in a mental hospital, where he rose to power and exacted revenge on those who harassed him and lost their powers.

Alongside the other Marauders, Prism ambushed the X-Men at Mystique's residence, and participated in the ensuing battle.  The Marauders quickly defeated the X-Men and kidnapped Rogue, returning to Mr. Sinister. It has also been revealed that Prism, with several of his teammates, assassinated the Dark Mother.

Prism's body is found shattered by the X-Men when they arrive at an Alaskan town, trying to find the new mutant baby who has been born.  Prism had been killed in a clash with the Purifiers and was eaten by Predator X after the X-Men left.

Prism's clone was later tracked down and killed by Magneto. Magneto reprogrammed the cloned Marauders to serve under his command, and when they were reborn, Prism and the other mercenaries joined Magneto's side.

Powers and abilities
Able to refract most forms of energy directed at him, including ambient light. He is also capable of storing light within his body, using it as a form of illumination or as a means of blinding his opponents.

Death count
Prism has apparently died four times during his time as a Marauder.  The first was when Jean Grey used her telekinetic powers to throw Prism against a wall, smashing him to pieces.  The second was during Inferno, where a group of policemen shot Prism and shattered him. The third time was when X-Man used his mental powers to slaughter all of the Marauders. His shattered body is found by the X-Men in an Alaskan town, where he and the Marauders fought the Purifiers, and it was revealed he was killed and eaten by Predator X. It is unknown if Prism actually does die, or if he is able to piece his crystal body back together; Sinister regularly cloned members of the Marauders when they died, however, after M-Day it is unclear whether Sinister's samples of the Marauders survived and whether he can be cloned again.

References

External links
 Prism at Marvel.com
 

Characters created by Chris Claremont
Characters created by Louise Simonson
Clone characters in comics
Comics characters introduced in 1986
Fictional mercenaries in comics
Fictional murderers
Marvel Comics mutants
Marvel Comics supervillains